Fatma Atalar (born October 9, 1988 ) is a Turkish women's handballer, who plays in the Turkish Women's Handball Super League for İzmir B.B. SK, and the Turkey national team. The -tall sportswoman plays in the center back position.

She played for Trabzon Bld. SK (2006–2007) before she joined İzmir B.B. SK in 2013.

References 

1988 births
Sportspeople from Zonguldak
Turkish female handball players
İzmir Büyükşehir Belediyespor handball players
Turkey women's national handball players
Living people
Mediterranean Games silver medalists for Turkey
Competitors at the 2009 Mediterranean Games
Mediterranean Games medalists in handball
21st-century Turkish sportswomen